Marites Dañguilan Vitug is a Filipina journalist and author who co-founded the news magazine Newsbreak. She was a Nieman Fellow at Harvard University from 1986 to 1987.

Early life and education
Marites Dañguilan Vitug was raised by her parents to be a devout Catholic in Solano, Nueva Vizcaya. Her mother was a member of the Catholic Women's League, while her father was a member of the Knights of Columbus. Vitug in her youth joined the Catholic Marian society called the Sodality of Our Lady.

Vitug received her Bachelor of Arts degree in broadcast communication at the University of the Philippines Diliman.

Career
Vitug began her journalism career in the early 1980s, writing for the daily business newspaper Business Day (now BusinessWorld). Vitug cites the assassination of Benigno Aquino Jr. on August 21, 1983 as what prompted her to cover political issues and events such as insurgencies and protests, with the publisher of Business Day adding a political section to the paper.

Vitug's first book, titled Power from the Forest: The Politics of Logging, was published in 1993 by the Philippine Center for Investigative Journalism. She founded with fellow journalist Glenda Gloria the weekly news magazine Newsbreak, with its first issue released on January 24, 2001.

Vitug is currently the editor-at-large of the Filipino news site Rappler.

Bibliography
Vitug, Marites Dañguilan (1993). Power from the Forest: The Politics of Logging. Quezon City: Philippine Center for Investigative Journalism.
Vitug, Marites Dañguilan; Yabes, Criselda (1998). Jalan-Jalan: A Journey Through EAGA. Mandaluyong: Anvil Publishing.
Vitug, Marites Dañguilan; Gloria, Glenda M. (2000). Under the Crescent Moon: Rebellion in Mindanao. Quezon City: Ateneo Center for Social Policy & Public Affairs.
Vitug, Marites Dañguilan (2010). Shadow of Doubt: Probing the Supreme Court. Quezon City: Public Trust Media Group.
Vitug, Marites Dañguilan; Yabes, Criselda (2011). Our Rights, Our Victories: Landmark Cases in the Supreme Court. Quezon City: Cleverheads Publishing.
Vitug, Marites Dañguilan (2012). Hour Before Dawn: The Fall and Uncertain Rise of the Philippine Supreme Court. Quezon City: Cleverheads Publishing.
Almonte, Jose T.; Vitug, Marites Dañguilan (2015). Endless Journey: A Memoir. Quezon City: Cleverheads Publishing.
Vitug, Marites Dañguilan (2018). Rock Solid: How the Philippines Won Its Maritime Case Against China. Quezon City: Ateneo de Manila University Press.

References

External links
2002 Kyoto Review of Southeast Asia interview
2019 Georgetown Journal of Asian Affairs interview

Year of birth missing (living people)
20th-century Filipino women writers
21st-century Filipino women writers
Filipino Roman Catholics
Filipino women journalists
Investigative journalists
Nieman Fellows
People from Nueva Vizcaya
University of the Philippines Diliman alumni
Alumni of the London School of Economics
Living people